Nick Hutchins (born August 7, 1987) is a former professional Canadian football offensive lineman. He most recently played for the Saskatchewan Roughriders. He was drafted by the Roughriders in the third round of the 2009 CFL Draft and signed by the team on May 26, 2009. He played CIS football for the Regina Rams, and played his high school football at Thom Collegiate in Regina.

References

External links
Saskatchewan Roughriders bio

1987 births
Living people
Canadian football offensive linemen
Sportspeople from Regina, Saskatchewan
Players of Canadian football from Saskatchewan
Regina Rams players
Saskatchewan Roughriders players